A pundit is a person who offers mass media opinion or commentary on a particular subject area (most typically politics, the social sciences, technology or sport).

Origins
The term originates from the Sanskrit term , meaning "knowledge owner" or "learned man". It refers to someone who is erudite in various subjects and who conducts religious ceremonies and offers counsel to the king and usually referred to a person from the Hindu Brahmin but may also refer to the siddhas, Siddhars, Naths, ascetics, sadhus, or yogis (rishi).

From at least the early 19th century, a Pundit of the Supreme Court in Colonial India was an officer of the judiciary who advised British judges on questions of Hindu law. In Anglo-Indian use, pundit also referred to a native of India who was trained and employed by the British to survey inaccessible regions beyond the British frontier.

Current use

Josef Joffe's book chapter The Decline of the Public Intellectual and the Rise of the Pundit describes a change in the role of public experts and relates to developments in the audience and the media itself. In the second half of the 20th century, foreigners like Hannah Arendt or Jürgen Habermas and others gained a certain position in the US as public intellectuals due to the (over)specialization of US academics.

A pundit now combines the roles of a public intellectual and has a certain expertise as a media practitioner. They play an increasing role in disseminating ideas and views in an accessible way to the public. From Joffe's view, Karl Marx in Europe and e.g. in the US, Mark Twain were early and relentless pundits ante festum. In addition, the growing role of think tanks and research institutions like the Brookings Institution, the American Enterprise Institute and the Manhattan Institute provided a place for those dealing with 'big issues' in public language.

The term talking head (in existence since 1964) has derogatory overtones. For example, the judge in the David Westerfield trial in San Diego in 2002 said "The talking heads are doing nothing but speculating about what the jury may or may not be thinking".

Punditry has become a more popular vehicle in nightly newscasts on American cable news networks. A rise of partisanship among popular pundits began with Bill O'Reilly of Fox News Channel. His opinion-oriented format led him to ratings success and has led others, including Bill Maher, Keith Olbermann, and Nancy Grace to express their opinions on matters on their own programs.

In sports commentating, a "pundit" or color commentator may be partnered with a play-by-play announcer who will describe the action while asking the pundit for analysis.

Examples 
Popular in the United States during 2007 according to a Forbes top 10 list:

 Politics and current events
 Al Franken
 Bill Maher
 Bill O'Reilly
 Geraldo Rivera
 Greta Van Susteren
 Lou Dobbs
 Rosie O'Donnell
 Rush Limbaugh
 Film
 Roger Ebert
 Leonard Maltin
 Sports
 Gary Neville
 Jamie Carragher
 Roy Keane

See also 
 Columnist
 Opinion leadership
 Pundette
 Carl Diggler – fictional character parodying contemporary American political pundits
 Stephen Colbert (character)
 Talk radio
 Talk show

References

Political occupations